The Cybersecurity and Infrastructure Security Agency (CISA) is an agency of the United States Department of Homeland Security (DHS) that is responsible for strengthening cybersecurity and infrastructure protection across all levels of government, coordinating cybersecurity programs with U.S. states, and improving the government's cybersecurity protections against private and nation-state hackers. Its activities are a continuation of the National Protection and Programs Directorate (NPPD), and was established on November 16, 2018, when President Donald Trump signed into law the Cybersecurity and Infrastructure Security Agency Act of 2018.

History
The National Protection and Programs Directorate (NPPD) was formed in 2007 as a component of the United States Department of Homeland Security. NPPD's goal was to advance the Department's national security mission by reducing and eliminating threats to U.S. critical physical and cyber infrastructure.

On November 16, 2018, President Trump signed into law the Cybersecurity and Infrastructure Security Agency Act of 2018, which elevated the mission of the former NPPD within DHS, establishing the Cybersecurity and Infrastructure Security Agency (CISA). CISA is a successor agency to NPPD, and assists both other government agencies and private sector organizations in addressing cybersecurity issues. Former NPPD Under-Secretary Christopher Krebs was CISA's first Director, and former Deputy Under-Secretary Matthew Travis was its first deputy director.

On January 22, 2019, CISA issued its first Emergency Directive (19-01: Mitigate DNS Infrastructure Tampering) warning that "an active attacker is targeting government organizations" using DNS spoofing techniques to perform man-in-the-middle attacks. Research group FireEye stated that "initial research suggests the actor or actors responsible have a nexus to Iran."

In 2020, CISA created a website, titled Rumor Control, to rebut disinformation associated with the 2020 United States presidential election. On November 12, 2020, CISA issued a press release asserting, "There is no evidence that any voting system deleted or lost votes, changed votes, or was in any way compromised." On the same day, Director Krebs indicated that he expected to be dismissed from his post by the Trump administration. Krebs was subsequently fired by President Trump on November 17, 2020 via tweet for his comments regarding the security of the election.

On July 12, 2021, the Senate confirmed Jen Easterly by a Voice Vote. Easterly’s nomination had been reported favorably out of Senate Committee on Homeland Security and Governmental Affairs on June 16, but a floor vote had been reportedly held (delayed) by Senator Rick Scott over broader national security concerns, until the President or Vice President had visited the southern border with Mexico.

Performance
In September 2022, CISA released their 2023–2025 CISA Strategic Plan, the first comprehensive strategy document since the agency was established in 2018.

In August 2021, Easterly stated "One could argue we’re in the business of critical infrastructure, and the most critical infrastructure is our cognitive infrastructure, so building that resilience to misinformation and disinformation, I think, is incredibly important."

Divisions

CISA divisions include the:

 Cybersecurity Division
 Infrastructure Security Division
 Emergency Communications Division
 National Risk Management Center
 Integrated Operations Division
 Stakeholder Engagement Division

Committees

Cybersecurity Advisory Committee 
In 2021, the Agency created the Cybersecurity Advisory Committee with the following members:

 Steve Adler, Mayor, City of Austin, Texas
 Marene Allison, Chief Information Security Officer, Johnson & Johnson
 Lori Beer, Chief Information Officer, JPMorgan Chase
 Robert Chesney, James A. Baker III Chair in the Rule of Law and World Affairs, University of Texas School of Law
 Thomas Fanning, Chairman, President and CEO, Southern Company
 Vijaya Gadde
 Patrick D. Gallagher, Chancellor, University of Pittsburgh
 Ronald Green, Executive Vice President and Chief Security Officer, Mastercard
 Niloofar Razi Howe, Board Member, Tenable
 Kevin Mandia, Chief Executive Officer, Mandiant
 Jeff Moss, President, DEF CON Communications
 Nuala O’Connor, Senior Vice President & Chief Counsel, Digital Citizenship, Walmart
 Nicole Perlroth, Cybersecurity journalist
 Matthew Prince, Chief Executive Officer, Cloudflare
 Ted Schlein, General Partner, Kleiner Perkins; and Caufield & Byers
 Stephen Schmidt, Chief Information Security Officer, Amazon Web Services
 Suzanne Spaulding, Senior Advisor for Homeland Security, CSIS
 Alex Stamos, Partner, Krebs Stamos Group
 Kate Starbird, Associate Professor, Human Centered Design & Engineering, University of Washington
 George Stathakopoulos, Vice President of Corporate Information Security, Apple
 Alicia Tate-Nadeau (ARNG-Ret.), Director, Illinois Emergency Management Agency
 Nicole Wong, Principal, NWong Strategies
 Chris Young, Executive Vice President of Business Development, Strategy, and Ventures, Microsoft

Directors

See also
 List of federal agencies in the United States

References

External links
 

2018 establishments in the United States
Business services companies established in 2018
Computer security organizations
Emergency services in the United States
Government agencies established in 2018
United States Department of Homeland Security agencies